FAPL may refer to:

Freedom Alliance Party of Liberia
FA Premier League, a professional football league in England
Pongola Airport, South Africa by ICAO-code
Farnworth Area Pool League, an amateur pool league affiliated to the English Pool Association (EPA)